Culoptila is a genus of caddisflies found primarily in Central America as well as the United States.

Species

References

Glossosomatidae
Trichoptera genera
Insects of Central America
Insects of North America